Agnes Vernon (18951948) was an American film actress of the silent era. While still in her teens, she experienced a meteoric ascent from obscurity to box-office sensation. After turning twenty-three and a movie career fading away, she abandoned the silver screen forever. Vernon performed in over 90 films between 1913 and 1922. She completed most of her roles under contract with Universal Pictures.

Vernon was born into a pious Catholic  household in La Grande, Oregon on Friday, December 27, 1895. She attended convent schools in various cities, landing in Chicago while still a young schoolgirl. In 1913, while visiting a cousin in California, they took a tour of Universal Studios. While watching the filming of a motion picture, the film's director asked her to become an extra. At first, reluctant because she had no previous stage training, she finally agreed and took her early steps to film fame and fortune.

Murdock MacQuarrie took the young actress under his wing. Vernon rose from film extra to leading lady in 6 months. She would develop fan-favorite screen pairings with actors Franklyn Farnum and Herbert Rawlinson. 1916 became her watershed year, defined by her extensive film output and the number of leading roles.

In 1919, she traveled to Australia to make three films. She made her final return to America in 1922, having already married Director John K. Wells.
Her rapid rise and fall all happened within a decade. She is hardly remembered today like so many actors of the silent period.

Early life
This golden-haired girl with those big brown eyes was born Agnes Vernon to an Irish Catholic family in La Grande, Oregon  on December 27, 1895. Vernon lamented "she has never received any birthday presents because her friends give them all to her on Christmas day."
Vernon also stated "there was nothing particularly interesting about her childhood. I was perfectly normal. I went to school, played with dolls, and had an occasional spanking to break that monotony of my life."

Vernon claimed her family moved around the country. They eventually landed in Chicago, where Vernon enrolled in a convent school. After some time, they moved to Kansas City, where she attended another convent school that instilled a strong sense of discipline. After she was "finished," she moved to California with her mother.

In an article published in the Sacramento Star dated January 6, 1917, Agnes Vernon, in her own words, wrote, "It happened that I was spending a summer in California with a girl whom I had known in Chicago. Universal City was one of the trips arranged for me. We were watching the making of a scene on the big stage. A Director discovered he needed one more girl for a small bit. He looked around at the visitors and asked if I would try the small part for him. At first, I declined and finally consented. As the cameraman began to grind and the Director called his instructions, I was fascinated. The lure of the game had caught me." As Edmunds points out in his book -  "Casting at Universal, before things became more businesslike, was somewhat casual. A passing face, a friend visiting the set, or an odd happening that caught a director's eye — all these, as well as direct applications — often led to successful movie careers. This was not unusual. The Gish sisters got their start because they dropped in to see Mary Pickford one day at Biograph."

Vernon had previously claimed, "I had always had a sneaking desire for the other side of the footlights." After her movie experience, Vernon acquired an intense desire to be in films, but her prim mother would not hear of it.

Now Vernon would have to convince her mother to change her mind about an acting career. In Vernon's own words, "Then I decoyed her out there again, and she began to see its advantages. She realized the reasonable hours of the actors and their out-of-door existence. The chance of living, as she expressed it, 'like a Christian instead of traipsing all over the country,' gradually converted her to the idea of letting me try my luck." Even though she had no stage experience or Universal contacts, she had this all-consuming desire to succeed. Vernon got her name on an "extra list" at Universal City.

Career

Most fan magazine articles agree; Vernon started her movie career as an  player in March 1913. Those uncredited roles are unknown and, consequently, not listed in her filmography.

Universal distributed most of her films. They were well-received because she collaborated with specific actors like Murdock MacQuarrie, Herbert Rawlinson, and Franklyn Farnum. Her pairing with Herbert  Rawlinson would make them the most popular stars on the  Universal list.

Another facet of her film performances was her willingness to perform all sorts of athletic feats that her role required. An article in the Moving Picture Weekly pointed out, "She does everything that even a screen actress can be asked to do — rides, drives, runs a car, swims, dives, dances, plays any and every game, and will perform stunts with the best of the daredevils if the director says so. She jumped out of a third-story window to put a punch in the picture, one time, and in another, she dived off the deck of a steamer into the ocean."

Her early works at Universal were all , as was the trend. She acted in her first feature film in 1916. Then, between 1917 and 1919, Vernon made eleven more feature films. Vernon departed Hollywood in September 1919 and traveled to Australia. She would act in three feature films in Australia, then retire from acting, never to return.

1914
The first credited movie role for Agnes Vernon was the 3-reel short film Bison production of The Triumph of Mind, starring and directed by  Lois Weber. The film was released on May 23, 1914. Vernon plays the part of Daisya . This film was Vernon's introduction to  Ella Hall and Rupert Julian. Another Lois Weber production, Avenged, also released in May.

An article in The Universal Weekly dated December 26, 1914, stated, "Out in Universal City is a wonderful man who has taken a wonderful, bright, golden-haired little girl under his wing. The wonderful man is Murdock MacQuarrie, and his eighteen-year-old charge is Agnes Vernon."

MacQuarrie's decision to mentor Vernon would develop into a pivotal event in her motion picture career. Even though she had limited theatrical experience, he gave her a part in one of his upcoming films. He allowed her to learn the fundamentals of acting "on the job." Her first role in a MacQuarrie-directed project was the 2-reel film The Old Cobbler, distributed on June 27, 1914. The -year-old MacQuarrie plays Nathan — the old cobbler. Nathan moves out West and befriends Wild Bill, played by Lon Chaney. Wild Bill has a sweetheart and local dancer named Jess, played by  -year-old Agnes Vernon.

Vernon would make another 11 movies with MacQuarrie in 1914 and 20 more films in 1915, ending with The Tinker of Stubbenville, released on June 24, 1915. Vernon released 16 short films in 1914, all distributed by Universal. The majority had Murdock MacQuarrie as the lead. In 1914, she performed under the management of 5 directors: Lois Weber, Murdock MacQuarrie, Charles Giblyn, Otis Turner, and Joseph De Grasse.

Vernon's last film in 1914 was the MacQuarrie-directed film, When It's One Of Your Own, released on December 29, 1914. MacQuarrie plays Heinrich Gerhardt, a German Musician, and Agnes Vernon plays his daughter. Vernon received top billing as a female lead. She would make 32 films with MacQuarrie, or nearly one-third of her total film output.

In 1914, Vernon also performed in several films with Lon Chaney, including The Old Cobbler, A Ranch Romance, By the Sun's Rays, and The Oubliette. By the Sun's Rays has survived and is available on the Internet Archive  The Oubliette, released on August 15, 1914, was the first movie in a 4-part serial — The Adventures of François Villon directed by Charles Giblyn.  Vernon likewise performed in the fourth film of the 4-part serialNinety Black Boxes, released on November 21, 1914. The Oubliette is also available on the Internet Archive.

1915

As I.G. Edmunds points out in his book BIG U - Universal in the Silent Days, "The year 1915, although a great year for Universal as a leader of the motion picture industry, was not a good year financially for the industry as a whole. The European war cut down on foreign sales of movies. Also, domestic prices were increasing across the board. At the same time, the cost of production was in an inflationary spiral." 

By 1915, feature films were becoming more of the trend in Hollywood. By 1915, over 600 feature films were produced annually in the United States. However, Universal was not ready to downsize its short film business. There was a recurring claim that Carl Laemmle was the longest-running studio chief resisting the production of feature films. After all, short films were cheaper, faster, and more profitable to produce than feature films.

In January 1915, Vernon's life took an unexpected twist. It started with a publicity-seeking marriage proposal by a newspaper reporter. Vernon shocked everybody by accepting the offer, kick-starting a chain of events over four months. The entire sequence of events is examined in the  marriage section of this article.

Vernon's 1915 film output would increase to thirty-five short films. This year would become the highest film production of her entire movie career. This total included another twenty films with Murdock MacQuarrie. 1915 would become Vernon's introduction to Hobart Henley in the film Jane's Declaration of Independence, released on July 3, 1915. The  pairing would only produce five short films.

As Edmunds also observes, "At this time Universal was very strong on teams. Groups developed almost into stock companies with the same director, actor, actress, and supporting cast. Laemmle believed that if the public liked a certain girl and boy, they would like them in another picture."

Vernon was assigned to the William Worthington company in mid-1915. This assignment started a continuing professional relationship with the director and actress. Over Vernon's movie career, her relationship with Worthington would produce twenty-two films, including six feature films. The film Misjudged, released on August 31,  was Vernon's first movie, directed by Worthington and starring Herbert Rawlinson. The  combination would only produce three films in 1915, but the screen chemistry would result in another eleven films in 1916 and three features in 1917.

Another significant event occurred in early 1915. At 10 am on Monday, March 15, 1915, 10,000 people applauded as Carl Laemmle, president of the universal film manufacturing company, unlocked the gate to Universal City. It was a realization of Laemmle's dream to build the world's only city devoted solely to motion picture production. Company executives and movie stars greeted them as they passed through the gate. In the afternoon, the actors returned to their movie sets and resumed work on their projects as fans watched.

1916

Feature films were the future, but Universal continued to resist. While advertising short films in the trade journals, Universal might include a section titled  "The Universal Programs" situated atop the movie ads, espousing the advantages of continuing to show short films.

In 1916, Vernon acted in twenty-three pictures, including twenty-two short films and one feature-length production. Universal produced these films, and Vernon was featured prominently as the lead female. Her celebrity was rising, as noted by the first appearance of 1-page and 2-page spreads in trade journals.

William Worthington, directed almost half her movie output in 1916, all of which featured Herbert Rawlinson in the lead. During Vernon's movie career, her professional relationship with Worthington produced twenty-two films, including six feature films.

In 1916, she performed in two films with Franklyn Farnum, but the screen chemistry would bloom in 1917 when they continued to make six more movies. Farnum would become Vernon's introduction to comedy.

Agnes Vernon's first Bluebird film was A Stranger From Somewhere, released on November 13, 1916. William Worthington directed the picture and Franklyn Farnum was in the lead. This Bluebird release was the only feature film Vernon made in 1916. During her career, Vernon would star in sixteen feature films, and Franklyn Farnum would be the leading man in five of these films. Besides Worthington, she worked with an additional eight directors in 1916. Universal released ninety-one feature films in 1916 including fifty-four Bluebirds.

One of her last scheduled appearances in 1916 was to play Caroline in the Rupert Julian Bluebird production of The Right to Be Happy. Because of the injuries suffered in a car accident (see the next section), she could not fulfill this obligation, and Universal selected Roberta Wilson to play the role.

The accident

In mid-December 1916, 20-year-old Agnes Vernon, 29-year-old Eddie Laemmle, 49-year-old Bill Gillis, and Fred Robinson piled into a convertible automobile. They were members of the William Worthington company of  Bluebird players. Vernon was in the front passage seat; the actual driver was never identified. The group planned to drive West from Universal City to a location near  Chatsworth, California. Upon their arrival, they would explore sites for a new Western film. The accident happened after Thursday, December 7, 1916, and before Sunday, December 17, 1916.

Unknown circumstances caused the car to plunge into a ditch. Since Vernon was in the front seat, the impact threw her entirely out of the vehicle. The December 23, 1916 issue of the Moving Picture Weekly said "She was thrown from an automobile when it was going at a rapid rate of speed, and although not seriously injured, suffered a nervous shock which made her appearance at the studio impossible."

Another article reported in Los Angeles Evening Post-Record January 1, 1917, recounted, "For several days Agnes Vernon ... was confined to her home following injuries she received when thrown from an automobile."

A third article published in the Moving Picture Weekly dated January 27, 1917, headlined "Agnes Vernon Thrown from Auto." The official publication of Universal then stated: "For several days, Agnes Vernon, known as Brownie, who plays one of the leading roles in Director William Worthington's company in the forthcoming bluebird The Man Who Took a Chance was confined to her home, following injuries, she received when thrown from an automobile." The article finished using the phrasing "Eddie Lammle, Bill Gillis, and Fred Robinson was also "spilled" but escaped with merely a few bruises." Both articles offered a curious use of the word "spilled".

At the time of the accident, Vernon lived with her mother. Since Vernon was restricted to her home for several days following her injuries, her mother would help nurse her back to health.

Another harrowing automobile adventure would occur in 1917 while shooting A Stormy Knight. Franklyn Farnum and Vernon would drive together to and from the filming location on the summit of Mount Wilson. One day, the brakes gave way while traveling down the narrow road from the summit. The Moving Picture Weekly news item gives a detailed description of the wild ride down a mountainside. Fortunately, there were no injuries.

Accident's impact

Vernon's second scheduled feature film for 1916 was to be the Bluebird production of The Right to Be Happy. Universal planned this film to be the high point of the Christmas season. Rupert Julian directed the film and assumed the leading role of Ebenezer Scrooge. Most movie ads and articles claimed the leading ladies for the film were Francelia Billington and Agnes Vernon. Vernon was to play the role of Caroline, whose scenes would be the last to be filmed.

A December 2 article in Billboard stated Universal moved the film's release date from December 18 to December 25. Although the postponement was no fault of Vernon's, at the last minute, Roberta Wilson assumed the Vernon role in the film. Although no known news items cite the accident as the reason for Vernon's replacement, the circumstances are highly coincidental.

An article in the Motion Picture Weekly stated "Production of the five reel comedy-dramaFace Value, which features Franklyn Farnum and Agnes Vernon, has been delayed because of an accident which befell Miss Vernon." The film, renamed The Man Who Took a Chance, was released on February 23, 1917. The accident caused some costly production delays for the two films.

1917
The movie industry continued to reshape itself, including implementing more cost-cutting measures. Part of the increased expense of making movies was the upward trend of churning out more feature films. As Codori states in his book Film History Through Trade Journal Art, 1916-1920, "The year 1917 was not a good Financial year for Universal, despite the successful pictures that were made. The entrance of the United States into the European war caused prices to rise, squeezing Big U's profits. Then a number of male actors rushed off to join the army, causing other disruptions. The higher cost of the five-reel features of Bluebird and Red Feather further drained the treasury. Laemmle asked his actors to take a cut in salary."

This observation flew while an article in a trade journal reported a seemingly different situation. The back page headline in The Moving Picture World article dated September 22, 1917, read "Universal Increases Forces." The article stated, "More additions have been made to the acting and forces at Universal City during the past month than at Any Similar Period throughout the present year."

Vernon's film output for the year would drop to 13 productions, but this total included nine feature films. Vernon opened 1917 by performing in two short films. She would act in two more short pictures released in July. These four films would be the last short movies she ever made. Starting in February, Vernon continued to make seven Bluebird and three Butterfly feature films. Her last three films in 1917 reunited Vernon with her former lead Herbert Rawlinson.

The Bluebird comedy The Man Who Took a Chance, starring Franklyn Farnum, was released on February 19, 1917.  This production was only Vernon's second feature film. Two more Bluebird comedies followed — The Clock and Bringing Home Father, with the same cast and director.

In mid-1917, Agnes Vernon informed Universal she had permanently changed her prenomen from Agnes to Brownie. Vernon's baptismal name was Agnes, but even with her long, cork-screw blonde curly locks, her friends called her "Brownie". The nickname referred to her prominent brown eyes and her fondness for wearing brown appeal. After her announcement, she wanted her screen credits to read "Brownie Vernon". Bringing Home Father released June 4, 1917, marked the first time Vernon's screen credit reads "Brownie Vernon" instead of "Agnes Vernon".

In the Fall of 1917, -year-old director William Worthington departed Universal, moved to New York, and went to work for Goldwyn. Before his departure, he completed directing three Bluebirds featuring Farnum and Vernon. The first was Bringing Home Father. The Car of Chance released on July 9, and the last film, The Clean-Up, had an August 6 release date.

After Worthington's departure, Carl Laemmle selected -year-old Elmer Clifton as Worthington's replacement. Clifton started as an actor in 1912, acquiring roles in various D. W. Griffith projects. Griffith and Joseph Henabery mentored him personally. Although Clifton was an actor with no prior directorial experience, Universal gave him the high-profile assignment of directing Bluebird films. The first film that Clifton bore the sole responsibility for directing was the Bluebird production of The Flame of Youth, released on June 16, 1917. His next film was Midnight Man, released on August 13, 1917.

A Stormy Knight, released on September 9, 1917, would only be the third film Clifton directed. The movie starred veteran actor -year-old Franklyn Farnum and  -year-old Brownie Vernon. It would become the last film Vernon made with Farnum before he would become a "lone star." Clifton's fifth film was Flirting with Death released on September 18, 1917, attempted to cash in on the previous successful pairing of -year-old Herbert Rawlinson and Vernon. During the filming of Flirting with Death, director Clifton set a new record for scenes in a five-reel film. Clifton was said to have filmed 927 scenes for the film, double the number normally found in a feature film of this length.

In November, Universal released Fear Not featuring Rawlinson, directed by Allen Holubar, and reconnected Vernon with Murdock MacQuarrie (in a minor role). Holubar had directed only six films before this feature.

The High Sign was released on December 16, 1917, starring Rawlinson and directed by Clifton. An article in The Motion Picture News dated September 29, 1917, states – the set was "one of the costliest settings ever erected for a five-reel motion picture." This movie was the last film Vernon made for Universal.

In the mid-teens, the movie industry was realigning itself, including Universal. However, Vernon seemed to be getting all the work she could handle. The back page headline of an article published in The Moving Picture World dated September 15, 1917, read: "Brownie Vernon is a Busy Lady." 
Vernon's last two films were Butterflies. Many of the trade journals still called them Bluebirds. Some authors have suggested Butterflies were the new "Red Feather" films or that Butterflies were a step below Bluebirds. Universal promoted Bluebird as a prestige division – Butterfly was supposedly a little less prestigious 
Considering the star power, they assigned to the Butterfly line - "Butterfly's galaxy of stars will be found in the line-up either late in December or in  January bills. Ella Hall,  Harry  Carey,  Louise  Lovely,  Molly  Malone,  and  Little Zoe  Rae  now  comprise  the  fixed  stars  of  Butterfly." - this was probably not true.

Her last two pictures were both successful and involved loads of hard work. Both movies had Vernon as the female lead. In fact, in Fear Not, she was the main headliner. 
As Dr. Delamoir points out in her article on Louise Lovely, "Universal's management was keen to keep its stars in line and, during 1916 and 1917, some stars were forced to appear in less prestigious short films, including westerns. One of Universal's strategies for controlling and disciplining stars was to shove them into the less-prestigious brands."

In late 1917, the media called it the Universal "canning" spell. As part of the process, the news articles reported that Universal management had asked Vernon to play "" in a specific production. Vernon thought this request was beneath her status as a Universal leading lady. Rather than kowtow to a demeaning Universal management request, she packed up her "makeup boxes and wardrobe" and walked out. Universal promptly canceled her contract after her departure.

It was well known that "Carl Laemmle, president of Universal, had little use for stars, even though his advertising had helped to create them."  Asking Vernon to play an extra would equate her to an unproven new employee. However, requesting an established star to "play atmosphere" is a thin excuse for them "pack up," void their contract, and skedaddle.

Upon closer examination, Vernon's purported reason for leaving was a small detail of a much larger state of affairs. No creditable sources have surfaced that frame a broader motive behind Vernon's exit. The big question remains, how did Carl Laemmle let bankable talent leave Universal unless there were irreparable conditions beyond mitigation?
And lastly, did Bluebird stars have any leverage in any negotiations? In the book Universal Women: Filmmaking and Institutional Change in Early Hollywood, Cooper stated: "In early 1917, no other Universal director even began to approach Weber's track record as a maker of profitable feature films. More interestingly, the other directors to whom the company most frequently entrusted its Bluebirds in 1916—and continued to employ most regularly in the following year—generally lost money."
There is little doubt Vernon was a respected movie star, yet she had not reached the summit of picturedom and the rarified air that is superstardom.

1918
In 1918, a global pandemic introduced itself to the world. The "Spanish Flu" would permanently change the movie industry.

At the beginning of 1918, Brownie Vernon was  years old. She had been part of the movie industry since she was 18. She was single, living with her mother, and a jobless  free agent actress.

The media claimed after she departed from Universal, she started working for Liberty films. Records indicate she made no credited appearance in any Liberty films nor any films for any production company during 1918. The media claimed she spent a portion of 1918 recovering from an illness. The particular aliment was never specified.

Other events would make 1918 a year to remember. Great War in Europe, better known as World War I, ended on November 11, 1918. The troops were coming home. When the doughboys returned, they carried a pernicious present from abroad — the Spanish flu. "Two years later, nearly a third of the global population, or an estimated 500 million people, had been infected in four successive waves."

The influenza pandemic's effect on the movie industry was swift and severe. Sick people did not attend movie theaters. Attendance dropped precipitously, and many independently owned theaters closed. Reduced attendance and closed theaters meant less money to make movies and pay actors. The vicious cycle had started and would reshape the industry again.

1919
Vernon made a limited return to Hollywood in 1919. Brownie Vernon still had name recognition after her prolonged absence from Hollywood. Her next acting opportunity came in early 1919. Tom Mix, the "King of Cowboys," planned to make another one of his stunt-filled western movies.   Fox offered to fund this project. He needed a leading lady who could satisfy the demands of the film and would do what was necessary to make the film look realistic. Their first choice was Brownie Vernon, especially with her willingness to perform her own stunts. Fox released the Western titled The Coming of the Law on May 11, 1919. The film was directed by Arthur Rosson and Tom Mix was the leading man The film received good reviews.

On the heels of her return to the motion-picture industry, another Western followed — the Robinson-Cole's production of Bare-Fisted Gallagher released on June 22, 1919. This film featured William Desmond in the lead.

Vernon would make her last American-made feature film in August. The Paramount Pictures project Widow by Proxy featuring Marguerite Clark, was released on August 28, 1919. Upon completing this production, Vernon packed her suitcases and sailed for Australia to make bush movies. After her return from the Land Down Under, she permanently retired from the movie industry.

Post Hollywood

Australia
The first American contingent of film experts included Director Wilfred Lucas, his wife screenwriter Bess Meredyth Lucas, actress Brownie Vernon and Cinematographer John Doerrer and arrived in Sydney on September 2, 1919. These professionals were personally recruited by Snowy Baker and approved by  E. J. Carroll. They went to work immediately, beginning with research and location scouting.
Meredyth's conclusion prompted Lucas and Baker only to produce Australian bush pictures.

 
The fruits of the Lucas contingent resulted in a trio of films. The first film was The Man from Kangaroo, released in Australia on January 24, 1920. The film featured Snowy Baker, directed by Wilfred Lucas and written by Bess Meredyth. The film's leading lady was Agnes Vernon. They list John Wells as one of the assistant directors and a film editor. The 73-minute feature film was produced by E. J. Carroll and Snowy Baker. The film was shot on location in Kangaroo Valley during September and October 1919. The film was a success at the box office. The movie was repackaged for the American market, renamed to The Better Man and premiered in New York on November 1, 1921.  This was the only movie of the trio of Lucas films to survive.

 
The second film of the American troupe was The Shadow of Lightning Ridge, released in Australia on April 3, 1920. The feature was directed by Wilfred Lucas and written by Bess Meredyth. The film's featured leads were Snowy Baker and Agnes Vernon. John Wells is listed as the assistant director. The seven-reel feature film was produced by E. J. Carroll and Snowy Baker and their production company, Carroll-Baker Australian Productions.

Filming started early 1920 in the bush near Sydney, and at a studio built by E. J. Carroll. The film was well received in Australia and successful at the box office. The film was released in the U.S. under the same name on September 13, 1921, by William Selig  and Aywon Film Corporation. It is considered a lost film.

The Carrolls folded their production company after completing this film. They said "Lack of Australian stories suitable for dramatization and the fact that oversea producers were releasing films more than sufficient for market needs had also forced him and his associates to abandon the production of films."
 
Silks and Saddles was John K. Wells's big opportunity. Wells wrote, directed, co-edited, and produced the picture. The movie featured Wells's wife Brownie Vernon and Robert MacKinnon. They set the film in the world of horse racing.

The newly formed Australian company, Commonwealth Pictures, and The Carroll Brothers provided funding of £5,600 (approximately $250,000 in today's money) to finance the movie.  The film was released on March 5, 1921, and garnered good reviews. The film would eventually gross £50,000 (over two million in today's U.S. money). The Americanized version of the movie was renamed Queen o' Turf or Queen of the Turf and released in the United States on April 16, 1922. The film is one of the rare Australian silent movies to survive today.

Marriage
Agnes Vernon married John K. Wells in 1921. They remained for 27 years. Before her marriage to Wells, her engagement with Abe Duce made headlines in 1915.

Abe Deuce

Abe Deuce was a special writer for the Newspaper Enterprise Association. In 1915 he hatched a plan for a new series of feature stories. He planned to meet various young movie starlets, get to know them, propose marriage, and write detailed stories about his experiences after rejection.
 —
Abe Deuce writes a letter to the editor of the Los Angeles Record (see insert). The editor assigns the task to a staff writer, and she drives Deuce to the Universal lot. She introduces him to a publicity manager — Don Meany.  Meany is sympathetic to his pursuit and states he will introduce him to two ingenues tomorrow.
 —
Abe's first article is a 1300-word installment describing his introduction to -year-old actress Brownie Vernon and -year-old actress Helen Leslie. 
 —

 —
Abe is introduced to -year-old actress Ella Hall and -year-old actress Cleo Madison.

 —
Abe is introduced to -year-old actress Signe Auen. 

 —
 After her acceptance, Deuce roused his jeweler out of bed and purchased a diamond ring. On January 18, The Seattle Times claims it was love at first sight and now they will marry.

By the last week in January 1915, the official engagement announcement appeared in national newspapers and trade publications. In the next couple of months, Abe not only gives Vernon a diamond ring, but he also buys her a roadster since the teenager does not have a car. It is during this time, Deuce informs Vernon - they can only have one breadwinner in the family.  After marriage, the couple will move to the big city where he will work for a major newspaper. On the other hand, she will have to abandon her movie career and become a housewife while they raise a family.
  — The first announcements of the broken engagement started to appear in the media.

When Deuce told Vernon she would have to choose between career or domesticity, Vernon's choice became simple. One news item appearing through the US contains the quote - "I got married to make my future", said -year-old actress Pauline Bush with a happy smile. "And I didn't get married so that I could make mine", answered Agnes Vernon.

John K. Wells

A news article in Billboard, dated November 19, 1921, stated John K. Wells was already married to Brownie Vernon.

Wells also followed in his father's footsteps. In January 1925, the "California Directory of Brokers and Salesmen" posted John K. Wells establishing a corporation — Lathrop-Wells Inc. They become a real estate brokerage firm headquartered in La Jolla, California with the following officials:

The 1930 and 1940 Censuses also verify the marriage. John Wells was married to Judith Vernon Wells   for 27 years. There were no children.

Death
Judith Vernon Wells (Agnes Vernon) died of heart complications on Saturday, February 21, 1948, in  La Jolla, California,  (San Diego), California. She was interred at Greenwood Memorial Park in San Diego, California. On her death certificate, they list her occupation as - a housewife. 

Judith Vernon Wells's obituary reads:
 There is no mention of an acting career.

On Sunday, December 27, 1953, John K. Wells died of a heart attack in Glendale, California. He was  years old at the time of his death. Wells had formerly been in charge of publications for the  Church of Christ, Scientists in Arizona and currently worked as a sales representative for the Arizona radio station KTAR. There was no mention of any Hollywood connections in his obituary. John Wells was interred in San Diego, California's Greenwood Memorial Park Mausoleum next to his wife.

Myths

Some reviewers have inferred Agnes "Brownie" Vernon changed her stage name to "Bernice Vere" to continue acting in Australian pictures. Many of Bernice Vere's movie credits were changed to Brownie Vernon in various movie databases. These are the facts:

Agnes "Brownie" Vernon acted in 3 Australian movies. The trio of films was released between 1920 and 1921:
 The Man from Kangaroo - produced by the Baker-Meredyth-Lucas consortium, was released on January 24, 1920. Brownie Vernon played Muriel Hammond.
 The Shadow of Lightning Ridge - produced by Baker-Meredyth-Lucas - was released on April 3, 1920. Brownie Vernon played "Dorothy Harden," and Bernice Vere played "Portuguese Annie,"   After completing The Shadow of Lightning Ridge, Agnes Vernon left Australia and headed back to California in May 1920.
 Silks and Saddles - produced by Commonwealth Pictures, directed by Brownie's husband John K. Wells, and released on March 5, 1921. Brownie Vernon played Bobbie Morton. Vernon had returned to Australia to make this film and spent the remainder of 1921 in Australia while her husband pursued business opportunities. Vernon's time in Australia during 1921 is the primary source of the Agnes Vernon/Bernice Vere controversy. Brownie and her husband sailed for California in March 1922.

Bernice Vere made four movies in Australia before heading to Hollywood in November 1921.
 The Shadow of Lightning Ridge was released on April 3, 1920. The newspaper ads credit both Brownie Vernon and Bernice Vere. All newspaper ads for the movie, giving credit to both actresses, should have ended this controversy.
 The Jackeroo of Coolabong was the last movie produced by the Baker-Meredyth-Lucas consortium, released on October 16, 1920. The Fighting Breed is the repackaged version of this movie made for US audiences and released on September 1, 1921. IMDb listing for The Jackeroo of Coolabong credits Bernice Vere as "the Moll." The American Film Institute gives no credit to Bernice Vere but lists Agnes Vernon in the cast. The AFI site also displays this qualifier "Various sources have expressed doubt that Brownie Vernon appeared in the film." The IMDb listing for The Fighting Breed mentioned neither actress. Bernice did receive a review in the Australian media for her performance in this film.
 The Betrayer was released on March 19, 1921, and directed by Beaumont Smith. Bernice Vere played Eleanor Barris. IMDbcredits Agnes Vernon playing Eleanor Barris. The Australian media notes - In March–April timeframe of 1921, Beaumont Smith took "from Sydney, a company of 12 actors and actresses, cameramen, and a full technical staff to  New Zealand." The article also published a list of the actors, which included Bernice Vere, and emphasized that Beaumont Smith only used Australian actors for this film.
 The Blue Mountains Mystery was released on November 5, 1921. Bernice Vere played Pauline Tracey. Silent Era credits "Bernice Vere (Agnes Vernon)" as playing the part of Pauline Tracey. IMDb credits "Agnes Vernon as Pauline Tracey". The Australian media provided two reviews for Bernice Vere as shown above validating her part in the movie. In May 1922, the film was released in the US after changing the title to The Blue Mountain Mystery. According to an advertisement in the Motion Picture News, the movie featured John Faulkner and Bernice Ware. The AFI record of the film shows Bernice Ware playing Pauline Tracey.

Filmography
This list is the selected filmography of Agnes (Brownie) Vernon. Vernon first appeared on the silver screen as an uncredited extra in March 1913. Her uncredited appearances are not chronicled in this filmography. All Universal feature products and non-Universal films are verified using the American Film Institute website or Internet Archive.

Gallery

See also
 List of rediscovered films

Notes

References

Bibliography

 
 
 
 
 
</ref>

Further reading

 
 
 
 Robert B. Connelly. The Silents: Silent Feature Films, 1910-36, Volume 40, Issue 2. December Press, 1998.

External links
 
 
 
 
 
 "The Shadow of Lightning Ridge" at SilentEra

Links to surviving films
 1914 
 1914 
 1919 
 1921 

1895 births
1948 deaths
American film actresses
American silent film actresses
Actresses from Oregon
People from La Grande, Oregon